Daniel Pickering is a New Hampshire politician.

Career
Pickering has worked as a teacher and as the treasurer of the Hancock Town Democratic Committee. On November 6, 2018, Pickering was elected to the New Hampshire House of Representatives where he represented the Hillsborough 3 district. He assumed office on December 5, 2018 and resigned on November 12, 2021. He is a Democrat.

Personal life
Pickering resides in Hancock, New Hampshire. Pickering is married.

References

Living people
American treasurers
Educators from New Hampshire
People from Hancock, New Hampshire
Democratic Party members of the New Hampshire House of Representatives
21st-century American politicians
Year of birth missing (living people)